Noel Frank Pope  (28 September 1931 – 15 August 2019) was a New Zealand local-body politician. He served as Mayor of Tauranga from 1983 to 1989 and 1995 to 2001.

In the 1998 Queen's Birthday Honours, Pope was appointed a Companion of the New Zealand Order of Merit, for services to local government. He died on 15 August 2019.

References

1931 births
2019 deaths
People from Hamilton, New Zealand
People educated at Tauranga Boys' College
Tauranga City Councillors
Mayors of Tauranga
New Zealand justices of the peace
Companions of the New Zealand Order of Merit